Ladislav Trojan  (1 August 1932 – 18 December 2022) was a Czech actor.

Life and career 
Born in Prague, Trojan began his career as a child actor in amateur theatre. He studied drama at the Theatre Faculty of the Academy of Performing Arts in Prague, and while still a student he made his film debut in Fráňa Šrámek's Silvery Wind (1954). Between 1959 and 1960 he starred in the first Czechoslovak television series, Rodina Bláhova. Between 1958 and 1965 he was part of the Zdeněk Nejedlý Realistic Theatre stage company, then he joined the  company, with whom he stayed until 1996. He took part in several Summer Shakespeare Festivals and frequently toured nationally and abroad. His filmography includes over one hundred credits between cinema and television. He was best known for his leading role in the 1960s hit series .  He retired from showbusiness in 2018.

Trojan died in his sleep on 18 December 2022, at the age of 90. He was the father of film director and producer Ondřej Trojan and actor Ivan Trojan.

References

External links

 

1936 births
2022 deaths  
Czech film actors
Czech television actors
Czech stage actors 
Actors from Prague
20th-century Czech male actors
21st-century Czech male actors